Agathis spathulata, the New Guinea kauri, is a species of Agathis native to the highlands of eastern Papua New Guinea, occurring at altitudes of 900–1980 m. Although long known, it has only relatively recently (1980) been distinguished from Agathis robusta, being described first as a subspecies of it, Agathis robusta subsp. nesophila Whitm., and subsequently separated as a distinct species Agathis spathulata in 1988. It is threatened by habitat loss.

It is a large evergreen tree growing up to 60 m tall. The leaves are in decussate opposite pairs, 7–10 cm long and 18–30 mm broad on mature trees, up to 13 cm long and 45 mm broad on young trees. The cones are oval, 8.5–10 cm long and 6.5-7.5 cm diameter, and disintegrate at maturity to release the winged seeds.

References

de Laubenfels, D. J. (1988). Coniferales. In van Steenis & de Wilde (eds.), Flora Malesiana 10: 337–453.

spathulata
Taxonomy articles created by Polbot